Farg may refer to:

 Farg, Kashmar, a village in Iran
 Farg, Markazi, a village in Iran
 River Farg, a small river in central Scotland
 Glen Farg small village and reservoir in Central Scotland

See also
 Fargo (disambiguation)
 Farge